Ridiculousness may refer to:

 The ridiculous, that which is highly incongruous or inferior
 Absurdity
 Nonsense
 Ridiculousness (TV series), an American comedy clip show
 Any of several spin-offs also called Ridiculousness

See also

 Ridiculous (disambiguation)
 Ridicule (disambiguation)